The Pagoda is a 1923 German silent film directed by Alfred Fekete and starring Olga Tschechowa, Ernst Deutsch, and William Dieterle.

Cast 
Olga Tschechowa
Ernst Deutsch
William Dieterle
Paul Bildt

References

Bibliography 
Bock, Hans-Michael & Bergfelder, Tim. The Concise CineGraph. Encyclopedia of German Cinema. Berghahn Books, 2009.

External links 

1923 films
Films directed by Alfred Fekete
Films of the Weimar Republic
German black-and-white films
German silent feature films
1920s German films